Alexis K. Rotella (born January 16, 1947, in Johnstown, Pennsylvania) is an American poet and artist. She has written poems in several of the traditional styles of Japanese poetry, including haiku, senryū, renga, and haibun.

Biography
Alexis received a bachelor's degree in philosophy from Drew University in Madison, New Jersey, where she wrote a thesis on Zen Buddhism. She also received a master's degree in Classical Acupuncture from The Academy for Five Element Acupuncture (formerly The Worsley Institute, Hallandale, Florida) as well as a doctorate in clinical hypnotherapy (American Institute of Hypnotherapy, Santa Ana, California).

In 1984, she served as the President of the Haiku Society of America and edited its haiku journal Frogpond the same year. In 2009, she founded Prune Juice, an English-language journal for senryu.

Rotella is the 2019-2020 honorary curator of the American Haiku Archives at the California State Library in Sacramento.

Personal life
Alexis Rotella resides in Greensboro, North Carolina.

Bibliography

Poetry
 Purple, The Merrow Report, 2014  
 Clouds In My Teacup, Wind Chimes Press, 1982
 Tuning the Lily, High/Coo Press mini-chapbook #18, 1983
 After an Affair Merging Media, 1984 (Haiku Society of America Merit Book Award runner-up)
 ASK!, Muse Pie Press, 1984
 Camembert Comes from the Sea, White Peony Press, 1984
 Harvesting Stars, Jade Mountain Press, 1984
 On a White Bud, Merging Media, 1984
 Closing the Circle, Muse Pie Press, 1985
 Polishing a Ladybug, Swamp Press, 1985
 Rearranging Light, Muse Pie Press, 1985 (Haiku Society of America Merit Book Award runner-up)
 Beards and Wings, White Peony Press, 1985
 Middle City, Muse Pie Press, 1986 (New Jersey State Council on the Arts Fellowship)
 Moonflowers, Jade Mountain Press, 1987
 Drizzle of Stars (renga with Scott Montgomery and Bob Boldman), Jade Mountain Press, 1988
 The Lace Curtain, Jade Mountain Press, 1988
 Antiphony of Bells: A Haiku Journey Through Italy in Simultaneous English and Italian, Jade Mountain Press, 1989
 An Unknown Weed, King's Road Press, 1991 (Haiku Society of America Merit Book Award runner-up)
 Carousel: 30 Senryu, Juniper Press, 1991 (third place, Haiku Society of America Merit Book Awards)
 Looking for a Prince, White Peony Press, 1991
 Voice of the Mourning Dove: An Anthology of Haiku, White Peony Press, 1991 
 Eleven Renga (with Florence Miller), Jade Mountain Press, 1993 
 Musical Chairs: A Haiku Journey Through Childhood, Jade Mountain Press, 1994
 Yes: A Dozen Linked Poems (with Florence Miller), Jade Mountain Press, 1994 
 A String of Monarchs: Thirteen Linked Poems (with Florence Miller), Jade Mountain Press, 1995 
 No One Inside (linked poem with Carlos Colón), Proof Press, 1996
 Sassy (with Carlos Colón) Tragg Publishing, 1998
 Eavesdropping: Seasonal Haiku, Modern English Tanka Press, 2007 
 Lip Prints (tanka), Modern English Tanka Press, 2007 
 Ouch: Senryu that Bite, Modern English Tanka Press, 2007 
 A Sprinkle of Glitter (a solo illustrated renga), Rosenberry Books, 2008
 Ask! Again: Rotellagrams, Rosenberry Books, 2008
 Looking for a Prince, Modern English Tanka Press, revised second edition, 2008 
 Elvis in Black Leather, Modern English Tanka Press, 2009
 Black Jack Judy and the Crisco Kids, Modern English Tanka Press, 2010
 Between Waves, Red Moon Press, 2015
 The Color Blue, Red Moon Press, 2017
 Old Diaries: Short Poems and Literary Fragments, Kindle, 2018
 Different Conversations: Short Poems and Literary Fragments, Kindle, 2018
 Dancing the Tarantella: Short Poems, Jade Mountain Press, 2019
 Scratches on the Moon: A Haibun Collection, Jade Mountain Press, 2019 (Touchstone Book Award), 2019

Nonfiction
 How Words and Thoughts Affect Your Body: The Book of Affirmations, Jade Mountain Press, 1989
 The Essence of Flowers, Jade Mountain Press, 1991

Additional Publications
 Unsealing Our Secrets (#MeToo Stories), Jade Mountain Press, Touchstone Book Award, 2019 
 Tanka 2020 Anthology: Poems for Today's World, Red Moon Press, 2020

See also
 Carlos Colón

References

 Featured Writer: Alexis Rotella

External links 
 Blog website

Living people
English-language haiku poets
1947 births
People from Johnstown, Pennsylvania
Drew University alumni